The 2005 Millennium International Tennis Championships was an ATP men's tennis tournament held in Delray Beach, Florida, United States that was part of the International Series of the 2005 ATP Tour. It was the 13th edition of the tournament and was held from January 31 to February 7. Third-seeded Xavier Malisse won the singles title.

Finals

Singles

 Xavier Malisse defeated  Jiří Novák 7–6(8–6), 6–2
 It was Malisse's first singles title of the year and of his career.

Doubles

 Simon Aspelin /  Todd Perry defeated  Jordan Kerr /  Jim Thomas 6–3, 6–3
 It was Aspelin's 1st title of the year and the 4th of his career. It was Perry's 1st title of the year and the 2nd of his career.

References

External links
 ITF tournament edition details

Millennium International Tennis Championships
Delray Beach Open
Millennium International Tennis Championships
Millennium International Tennis Championships
Millennium International Tennis Championships
DMillennium International Tennis Championships
2005 Millennium International Tennis Championships